Cuba competed at the 2012 Summer Olympics in London, from 27 July to 12 August 2012. This was the nation's nineteenth appearance in the Olympics.  With baseball's removal from the Olympic program and the absence of the nation's volleyball team for the first time, the Cuban Olympic Committee sent the nation's smallest delegation to the Games since 1964. A total of 111 athletes, 66 men and 45 women, competed in 13 sports. There was only a single competitor in archery and table tennis.

The Cuban team featured two defending Olympic champions: sprint hurdler Dayron Robles and Greco-Roman wrestler Mijaín López, who reprised his role as the nation's flag bearer at the opening ceremony. Only Lopez managed to successfully defend his Olympic title, in the men's super heavyweight division. Robles, on the other hand, missed out on the medal standings after he was disqualified in the finals. Skeet shooter Guillermo Torres, the oldest athlete of the team at age 53, became the first Cuban athlete to compete in seven Olympic Games since 1980. Other notable Cuban athletes included decathlon bronze medalist Leonel Suárez, swimmer and Pan-American games medalist Hanser García, and four-time Olympic diver José Guerra.

Cuba left London with a total of 14 medals (5 gold, 3 silver, and 6 bronze), being considered its worst Olympic Games since 1976. Four of these medals were awarded to the athletes in boxing, three in judo, and two each in track and field and in wrestling. Among the nation's medalists were heavyweight judoka Idalys Ortiz, who previously won the bronze in Beijing, flyweight boxer Robeisy Ramírez, the youngest athlete of the team at age 18, and pistol shooter Leuris Pupo, who won Cuba's first ever gold medal in his sporting discipline.

In May 2013, Yarelys Barrios was awarded the bronze in the women's discus throw when Russia's Darya Pishchalnikova tested positive for oxandrolone and was thereby stripped of her medal. As a result, Cuba's medal total increased to 15.

Medalists

| width="78%" align="left" valign="top" |

| width="22%" align="left" valign="top" |

Archery

Cuba has qualified one archer.

Athletics

Cuban athletes have so far achieved qualifying standards in the following athletics events (up to a maximum of 3 athletes in each event at the 'A' Standard, and 1 at the 'B' Standard):

Men
Track & road events

Field events

Combined events – Decathlon

Women
Track & road events

Field events

Boxing

Cuba has so far qualified boxers for the following events

Men

Canoeing

Sprint
Cuba has qualified boats for the following events

Qualification Legend: FA = Qualify to final (medal); FB = Qualify to final B (non-medal)

Cycling

Road

Track
Sprint

Keirin

Omnium

Diving

Cuba has qualified in the following events.

Men

Women

Judo

Men

Women

Rowing

Cuba has qualified the following boats.

Men

Women

Qualification Legend: FA=Final A (medal); FB=Final B (non-medal); FC=Final C (non-medal); FD=Final D (non-medal); FE=Final E (non-medal); FF=Final F (non-medal); SA/B=Semifinals A/B; SC/D=Semifinals C/D; SE/F=Semifinals E/F; QF=Quarterfinals; R=Repechage

Shooting

Cuba has qualified four quota places in the shooting events;

Men

Women

Swimming

Cuban swimmers have so far achieved qualifying standards in the following events (up to a maximum of 2 swimmers in each event at the Olympic Qualifying Time (OQT), and 1 at the Olympic Selection Time (OST)):

Men

Table tennis 

Cuba has qualified 1 athlete.

Taekwondo

Cuba has qualified 1 man and 2 women.

Weightlifting

Cuba has qualified 4 men.

Wrestling

Cuba has qualified quota places in the following events

Men's freestyle

Men's Greco-Roman

Women's freestyle

See also
Cuba at the 2011 Pan American Games

References

Nations at the 2012 Summer Olympics
2012
Summer Olympics